A Cure for Cancer is a novel by British fantasy and science fiction writer Michael Moorcock, first published in London 1971 by Allison and Busby. The book is part of Moorcock's long-running Jerry Cornelius series.

The second novel of the sequence is essentially a collage of absurdist vignettes, many of which first appeared in an eclectic range of British and American magazines.

Plot 
Jerry inhabits a world at war with itself and, armed only with an occasional "vibragun" appears to fight "against history" for the freedom of "randomness" against the straitlaced conventions exemplified by his brother Frank. In the end Jerry's quest, oblique as it is, is perhaps more artistic than political.

References

Further reading 

1971 British novels
1971 science fiction novels
Novels by Michael Moorcock
Allison and Busby books